Godroniopsis is a genus of fungi in the family Helotiaceae. The genus contains two species.

The genus name of Godroniopsis is in honour of Dominique Alexandre Godron (1807–1880), who was a French physician, botanist, geologist and speleologist.

The genus was circumscribed by William Webster Diehl and Edith Katherine Cash in Mycologia Vol.21 on page 243 in 1929.

References

Helotiaceae